The Sun Odyssey 49i is a French sailboat that was designed by Philippe Briand as a cruiser and first built in 2009.

The "i" in the designation indicates that the deck is injection-molded.

Production
The design was built by Jeanneau in France, starting in 2009, but it is now out of production.

Design
The Sun Odyssey 49i is a recreational keelboat, built predominantly of fiberglass, with wood trim. It has a fractional sloop rig, a slightly raked stem, a reverse transom with a swimming platform, an internally mounted spade-type rudder controlled by dual wheels and a fixed fin keel optional deep draft keel or shoal draft keel. The fin keel model displaces  and carries  of ballast, while the deep draft version carries  of ballast. A bow thruster is optional.

A "performance" version employs the deep draft keel and a mast that is about  taller, with about 32% greater sail area.

The design has three and four cabin layouts, providing sleeping accommodation for six to eight people. The three cabin version has a double island berth in the bow cabin, a "U"-shaped settee and a straight settee in the main cabin and two aft cabins, each with a double berth. The four cabin model divides the bow cabin into two smaller ones, each with a "V"-berth. The galley is located on the port side just forward of the companionway ladder, admidships. The galley is of straight configuration and is equipped with a four-burner stove, a refrigerator, freezer and a double sink. A navigation station is opposite the galley, on the starboard side. Two to four  heads may be fitted, fore and aft, for each cabin.

Operational history
In a 2009 review for Cruising World, Mark Pillsbury concluded, "all in all, the new Sun Odyssey 49i is a well-laid-out boat with enough volume and comfort to allow an owner to entertain in port while offering all the performance you need under sail to leave a cruising couple or family with smiles on their faces at the end of a journey or an afternoon on the water."

See also
List of sailing boat types

References

External links

Sun Odyssey 49i video

Keelboats
2000s sailboat type designs
Sailing yachts
Sailboat type designs by Philippe Briand
Sailboat types built by Jeanneau